Teja Zupan (born 4 December 1990, in Radovljica) is a Slovenian swimmer, who specialized in open water marathon. Zupan qualified for the 2008 Summer Olympics in Beijing, after placing tenth in the 10 km Marathon Swimming Olympic test event at Shunyi Olympic Rowing-Canoeing Park. Zupan swam in the first-ever women's 10 km open water marathon, against a field of 24 other competitors, including South African amputee swimmer Natalie du Toit, British duo Keri-Anne Payne and Cassandra Patten, and sixteen-year-old American Chloe Sutton. Zupan finished the race in twelfth place, with a total time of 1:59:43.7, sixteen seconds behind winner Larisa Ilchenko of Russia.

References

External links
NBC 2008 Olympics profile

1990 births
Living people
Slovenian female swimmers
Olympic swimmers of Slovenia
Swimmers at the 2008 Summer Olympics
Female long-distance swimmers
People from Radovljica
20th-century Slovenian women
21st-century Slovenian women